Deh Now is a village in Jereh Rural District, Jereh and Baladeh District, Kazerun County, Fars Province, Iran. At the 2006 census, its population was 97, in 20 families.

References 

Populated places in Kazerun County